Duddingston & Craigmillar Railway Station was a railway station in Scotland on the Edinburgh Suburban and Southside Junction Railway. It served the Duddingston and Craigmillar areas of Edinburgh's south side.  It was opened on 1 December 1884.

Duddingston & Craigmillar station closed in 1962, when passenger rail services were withdrawn from the Edinburgh Suburban line although the line itself was retained for rail freight use. The route continues to be used for freight services to this day, so freight trains avoid Edinburgh's main stations of Edinburgh Waverley and Haymarket, and occasionally diverted passenger trains also pass along this line.

Future
A local advocacy group, the Capital Rail Action Group (CRAG), is running a campaign for the SSJR line to be re-opened to passenger services, and proposes that it should be operated either as a commuter rail service or as a light rail system to form an extension of the forthcoming Edinburgh Tram Network. Following a petition submitted to the Scottish Parliament in 2007, the proposal was rejected in 2009 by transport planners due to anticipated cost.

References

External links

Disused railway stations in Edinburgh
Former North British Railway stations
Railway stations in Great Britain opened in 1884
Railway stations in Great Britain closed in 1962